Conus sakalava is a species of sea snail, a marine gastropod mollusk in the family Conidae, the cone snails, cone shells or cones.

These snails are predatory and venomous. They are capable of "stinging" humans.

Description
The length of the shell of the holotype measures 29.9 mm.

Distribution
This marine species of cone snail occurs off Madagascar

References

 Monnier E. & Tenorio M.J. (2017). New cones from North-West Madagascar (Gastropoda: Conidae) / Nouveaux cones du Nord-Ouest de Madagascar (Gastropoda: Conidae). Xenophora Taxonomy. 17: 32-40.

sakalava
Gastropods described in 2017